Bastilla joviana is a moth of the family Noctuidae first described by Stoll in 1782. It is found from the Oriental region to the Moluccas and in New Guinea and Australia. It is also present in South Africa.

The larvae feed on Acalypha, Breynia and Phyllanthus species.

Subspecies
Bastilla joviana joviana
Bastilla joviana curvisecta (New Guinea and Australia)

References

External links

Bastilla (moth)
Moths of Asia
Moths of Japan
Moths described in 1782